Phreatichthys andruzzii, a species of cyprinid fish, is the only species of the genus Phreatichthys, and is endemic to Somalia. This cave-adapted fish is whitish (not pigmented) and blind. It is considered to have evolved in the cave environment for some two million years. Its name derives from the Greek words phreasatos for spring, and ichthys for fish.

This fish is the first animal discovered that does not adjust its biological clock with the light of the sun. It has an unusual internal clock, which measures the passage of time with an extremely long period (up to 47 hours). It is also completely blind to all light stimuli.

Two other cavefish species are found in Somalia: the cyprinid Barbopsis devecchi and the catfish Uegitglanis zammaranoi.

References

Cave fish
Cyprinid fish of Africa
Fish of Somalia
Endemic fauna of Somalia
Fish described in 1924
Taxonomy articles created by Polbot